Landgrebe is a German surname. Notable people with the surname include:

Earl F. Landgrebe (1916–1986), American politician and businessman
Gudrun Landgrebe (born 1950), German actress
Ludwig Landgrebe (1902–1991), Austrian phenomenologist

German-language surnames